The 1949–50 Scottish Division A was won by Rangers by one point over nearest rival Hibernian. Queen of the South and Stirling Albion finished 15th and 16th respectively and were relegated to the 1950–51 Scottish Division B.

Rangers won the league with a 2–2 draw in their last match, away to Third Lanark, a game in which Rangers took a 2–0 lead before Thirds fought back to 2–2. Another goal for Third Lanark would have handed the title to Hibernian. A few days previously, Rangers had drawn 0–0 with Hibs at Ibrox before a crowd of 101,000, the largest crowd to watch a League match in Britain since the war, a record that still stands. Had Hibs won this match they would have become champions.

League table

Results

References

 Scottish Football Archive

1949–50 Scottish Football League
Scottish Division One seasons
Scot